A speech sound disorder (SSD) is a speech disorder in which some sounds (phonemes) are not produced or used correctly. The term "protracted phonological development" is sometimes preferred when describing children's speech, to emphasize the continuing development while acknowledging the delay.

Classification 

Speech sound disorders may be subdivided into two primary types, articulation disorders (also called phonetic disorders) and phonemic disorders (also called phonological disorders). However, some may have a mixed disorder in which both articulation and phonological problems exist. Though speech sound disorders are associated with childhood, some residual errors may persist into adulthood.

Articulation disorders 
Articulation disorders (also called phonetic disorders, or simply "artic disorders" for short) are based on difficulty learning to physically produce the intended phonemes. Articulation disorders have to do with the main articulators which are the lips, teeth, alveolar ridge, hard palate, velum, glottis, and the tongue. If the disorder has anything to do with any of these articulators, then it is an articulation disorder. There are usually fewer errors than with a phonemic disorder, and distortions are more likely (though any omissions, additions, and substitutions may also be present). They are often treated by teaching the child how to physically produce the sound and having them practice its production until it (hopefully) becomes natural. Articulation disorders should not be confused with motor speech disorders, such as dysarthria (in which there is actual paralysis of the speech musculature) or developmental verbal dyspraxia (in which motor planning is severely impaired).

List

 Deltacism is a difficulty in producing d sound.
 Etacism is a difficulty in producing e sound.
 Gamacism is a difficulty in producing g sound.
 Hitism is a difficulty in producing /h/ sound.
 Iotacism is a difficulty in producing /j/ sound.
 Kapacism is a difficulty in producing k sound.
 Lambdacism (from the Greek letter λ) is the difficulty in pronouncing l and similar sounds.
 Rhotacism is a difficulty producing r sounds in the respective language's standard pronunciation.
 In Czech there is a specific type of rhotacism called rotacismus bohemicus which is an inability to pronounce the specific sound  .
 Sigmatism is a difficulty of producing s, z and similar sounds.
 Tetacism is a difficulty of producing t sound.
 Tetism is replacement of s, k and similar sounds with t and of z and similar sounds with d.

Phonemic disorders 
In a phonemic disorder (also called a phonological disorder) the child is having trouble learning the sound system of the language, failing to recognize which sound-contrasts also contrast meaning. For example, the sounds /k/ and /t/ may not be recognized as having different meanings, so "call" and "tall" might be treated as homophones, both being pronounced as "tall." This is called phoneme collapse, and in some cases many sounds may all be represented by one — e.g., /d/ might replace /t/, /k/, and /g/. As a result, the number of error sounds is often (though not always) greater than with articulation disorders and substitutions are usually the most common error. Phonemic disorders are often treated using minimal pairs (two words that differ by only one sound) to draw the child's attention to the difference and its effect on communication.

Some children with phonemic disorders can hear that two phonemes are different from each other when others speak, but are not aware that those phonemes sound the same when they themselves speak. This is called the fis phenomenon, after a scenario in which a speech pathologist says, "You said 'fis,' did you mean 'fish'?" And the child responds, "No, I didn't say 'fis,' I said 'fis'." In some cases, a child is making sounds which, while similar, are acoustically distinct. Others don’t hear that difference, however, because the two sounds are not treated as separate phonemes in the language being spoken.

Though phonemic disorders are often considered language disorders in that it is the language system that is affected, they are also speech sound disorders in that the errors relate to use of phonemes. This makes them different from specific language impairment, which is primarily a disorder of the syntax (grammar) and usage of language rather than the sound system. However, the two can coexist, affecting the same person.

Other disorders can deal with a variety of different ways to pronounce consonants.  Some examples are glides and liquids.  Glides occur when the articulatory posture changes gradually from consonant to vowel. Liquids can include /l/ and /ɹ/.

Mixed speech sound disorders 
In some cases phonetic and phonemic errors may coexist in the same person. In such case the primary focus is usually on the phonological component but articulation therapy may be needed as part of the process, since teaching a child how to use a sound is not practical if the child does not know how to produce it.

Residual errors 
Even though most speech sound disorders can be successfully treated in childhood, and a few may even outgrow them on their own, errors may sometimes persist into adulthood rather than only being not age appropriate. Such persisting errors are referred to as "residual errors" and may remain for life.

Presentation 

Errors produced by children with speech sound disorders are typically classified into four categories:

Omissions: Certain sounds are not produced — entire syllables or classes of sounds may be deleted; e.g., fi' for fish or 'at for cat. This differs from features like non-rhoticity, h-dropping or l-vocalization which are part of various regional, national, and ethnic accents and are generally not considered disorders.
Additions (or Epentheses/Commissions): an extra sound or sounds are added to the intended word; e.g. puh-lane for plane.
Distortions: Sounds are changed slightly so that the intended sound may be recognized but sounds "wrong," or may not sound like any sound in the language.
Substitutions: One or more sounds are substituted for another; e.g., wabbit for rabbit or tow for cow.  
Sometimes, even for experts, telling exactly which type has been made is not obvious — some distorted forms of /ɹ/ may be mistaken for /w/ by a casual observer, yet may not actually be either sound but somewhere in between. Further, children with severe speech sound disorders may be difficult to understand, making it hard to tell what word was actually intended and thus what is actually wrong with it. Some terms can be used to describe more than one of the above categories, such as lisp, which is often the replacement of /s/ with /θ/ (a substitution), but can be a distortion, producing /s/ just behind the teeth resulting in a sound somewhere between /s/ and /θ/.

There are three different levels of classification when determining the magnitude and type of an error that is produced:
 Sounds the patient can produce
A: Phonemic- can be produced easily; used meaningfully and contrastively
B: Phonetic- produced only upon request; not used consistently, meaningfully, or contrastively; not used in connected speech
 Stimulable sounds
A: Easily stimulable
B: Stimulable after demonstration and probing (i.e. with a tongue depressor)
 Cannot produce the sound
A: Cannot be produced voluntarily
B: No production ever observed

Note that omissions do not mean the sound cannot be produced, and some sounds may be produced more easily or frequently when appearing with certain other sounds: someone might be able to say "s" and "t" separately, but not "st," or may be able to produce a sound at the beginning of a word but not at the end. The magnitude of the problem will often vary between different sounds from the same speaker.

Causes 
Most speech sound disorders occur without a known cause. A child may not learn how to produce sounds correctly or may not learn the rules of speech sounds on their own. These children may have a problem with speech development, which does not always mean that they will simply outgrow it by themselves.  Many children do develop speech sounds over time but those who do not often need the services of a Speech-Language Pathologist to learn correct speech sounds.

Some speech sound errors can result from other syndromes or disorders such as:

 developmental disorders (e.g. autism)
 genetic disorders (e.g. Down syndrome)
 hearing loss, including temporary hearing loss, such as from ear infections
 cleft palate or other physical anomalies of the mouth
 illness
 neurological disorders (e.g. cerebral palsy)

Diagnosis 
According to the DSM-5, about 50% of speech from a typical 2-year-old child may be intelligible. A 4-year-old child's speech should be intelligible overall, and a 7-year-old should be able to clearly produce most words consistent with community norms for their age. Misarticulation of certain difficult sounds ([], [],
[], [], [], [], [], [], and []) may be normal up to 8 years. Children with speech sound disorder have pronunciation difficulties inappropriate for their age, and the difficulties are not caused by hearing problems, congenital deformities, motor disorders or selective mutism.

The DSM-5 diagnostic criteria for speech sound disorder require a persistent difficulty with speech sound production since an early developmental age. For diagnosis, this must lead to difficulty in effective communication and tangible negative social outcomes like reduced academic or occupational performance. Diagnosis is ruled out if the underlying cause is a birth defect or acquired condition such as cerebral palsy, cleft palate, deafness or hearing loss and traumatic brain injury. Other speech disorders can be diagnosed along with speech sound disorder, although differential diagnosis with selective mutism can be difficult due to normal speech being observed only in some settings.

Treatment
For most children, the disorder is not lifelong and speech difficulties improve with time and speech-language treatment. Prognosis is poorer for children who also have a language disorder, as that may be indicative of a learning disorder.

See also 
Accent (sociolinguistics)
Developmental verbal dyspraxia
FOXP2
KE family
Infantile speech
Speech and language pathology
Whistled sibilant s, associated with some speech disorders, though found naturally in languages such as Shona

References

Further reading

Bowen, C. (2009). Children's speech sound disorders. Oxford: Wiley-Blackwell
Raz, M. (1992). How to Teach a Child to Say the "S" Sound in 15 Easy Lessons. GerstenWeitz Publishers  
Raz, M. (1996). How to Teach a Child to Say the "R" Sound in 15 Easy Lessons. GerstenWeitz Publishers  
Raz, M. (1999). How to Teach a Child to Say the "L" Sound in 15 Easy Lessons. GerstenWeitz Publishers

External links 
Children's Speech Sound Disorders

Communication disorders
Speech disorders
Speech and language pathology
Speech error
Language disorders